St Barnabas Church is a small wooden Anglican church in Warrington, New Zealand. It was built in 1872.

History
Anglicans met at the Pitt residence in Warrington until Mrs Pitt donated  of land for a church. The building was built by Benjamin Smith, opening on 11 November 1872.

The church building and its community are named after St Barnabas, one of the first prophets and teachers of the Christian Church at Antioch. In 2018, St Barnabas Church was in the Archdeaconry of Coastal Otago, part of the Anglican Diocese of Dunedin.

Building
The church is set in woodland and is surrounded by a cemetery. Otago's first Anglican Bishop, Samuel Tarratt Nevill was buried here in 1921. A traditional lych gate marks the entrance from Coast Road. The church is built in board and batten with a wooden shingle roof and a small copper-tipped tower, fitted with a bell inside. The stained glass windows are unusually elaborate for such a small building. They depict among others St. Joan of Arc and Christ the Redeemer. They have been said to have been ordered for a Roman Catholic church in Brisbane but diverted to Dunedin following a waterfront dispute. However recent research has found this to be mythical, and the real story of their original destination is even more complicated and interesting.  The building is listed as a Category II Historic Place.

References

Further reading

External links
St Barnabas Church website

Churches completed in 1872
19th-century Anglican church buildings
Anglican churches in New Zealand
Churches in Dunedin
Heritage New Zealand Category 2 historic places in Otago
Listed churches in New Zealand
1870s architecture in New Zealand